Draupadi Vastrapaharanam may refer to:
 Draupadi Vastrapaharanam (1936 film), a Telugu film
 Draupadi Vastrapaharanam (1934 film), a Tamil-language film